Eurovent is Europe's Industry Association for Indoor Climate (HVAC), Process Cooling, and Food Cold Chain Technologies. Its members from throughout Europe represent more than 1.000 companies, the majority small and medium-sized manufacturers. The organisation's activities are based on highly valued democratic decision-making principles, ensuring a level playing field for the entire industry independent from organisation sizes or membership fees.

History
Eurovent is one of the oldest industry associations of its kind. The association as we know it today is the result of the merger of the associations CECMA, the European Committee of Constructors of Air Handling Equipment, and CECOMAF, the European Committee of Refrigeration Equipment Manufacturers, in June 1996.

1951-1960: European Union and association development 
The association represents an industry that started to develop in the 1950s, at a time when the market for heating and refrigeration systems started to grow rapidly. Simultaneously, the European Economic Community was founded and marked the start of a unified regulatory system for goods and services.

European manufacturers of air handling technologies felt the need for in-depth cross-national coordination and information exchange, leading to the foundation of CECMA (later Eurovent) in 1958. Its founding members were national industry associations from Belgium, France, Germany, Italy and the Netherlands.

Simultaneously, associations from the same countries representing the refrigeration equipment industry formed the European Committee of Refrigeration Equipment Manufacturers (CECOMAF), which closely cooperated with CECMA from the very beginning.

These associations were set up with two main objectives. First, to jointly develop working terminology in order to enhance communication. Second, to develop ‘codes of good practice’ or ‘Recommendations’ in Technical Committees and to implement those as national standards. The latter process formed the basis of the European industry's self-regulatory system, which, to date, is still a commonly used procedure in situations where no national or European standard is available.

1961-1989: Activity expansion 
In the course of the constant enlargement of the European Union, CECMA and CECOMAF expanded accordingly, with national associations joining from both EU and non-EU member states, such as Denmark, the United Kingdom, Switzerland and Sweden. Around the same time, in 1964, CECMA changed its name to Eurovent.

The first oil crisis and the search for solutions in the early 1970s further enhanced relations within the industry. Eurovent and CECOMAF started to jointly organise fairs as of 1976, meeting two viable needs: The creation of a single representative exhibition organised for and by the entire HVACR industry, and the generation of revenues, aimed to cover the associations’ increased activities.

By the early 1980s, twelve Eurovent ‘Working Groups’ (today called ‘Product Groups’) actively worked on standardisation development following the increased production and marketing of specialised products. CECOMAF and Eurovent developed joint recommendations and technical documents, which increasingly obtained recognition and were sold in high numbers (about 300 copies annually) across Europe and beyond.

1990-1999: Industry expansion 
In 1991, Eurovent, together with its partner associations from Canada, Japan and the United States, founded the International Council of Air-conditioning and Refrigeration Manufacturers Association (ICARMA), a cross-national organisation bringing together representatives from HVACR associations worldwide. Today, ICARHMA (with the heating sector being added over time) members meet once a year, now also including associations from Australia, Brazil, China and South Korea.

In June 1996, further cooperation between CECOMAF and Eurovent finally led to the merger of the two associations into the European Committee of Air Handling and Refrigeration Equipment Manufacturers, known as Eurovent/CECOMAF.

2000-2010: Effects of the European Single Market 
With the beginning of the new millennium, European legislation proliferated and Eurovent redefined its priorities to deal with a selection of them. In general, the Working Groups covered one or more of the laws applying to their products.

In 2007, it was decided to change the name of the association from CECOMAF/Eurovent to simply Eurovent. By now, the European politicians and legislators noted that, in order to ensure a properly functioning Single Market and the reaching of common goals, it was necessary to introduce directly applicable laws (so-called EU Regulations). Eurovent became more actively involved in the decision-making procedures, representing the major part of the HVACR industry.

This was also the period during which legislators realised that product legislation needed to be accompanied by mandatory standards, in order to ease the manner in which presumption of conformity could be shown by manufacturers.

2011-present: Redevelopment of the association 
By 2010, Eurovent revised its working methods and redeveloped its corporate structure.

Until 2014, the industry had largely used the HVACR terminology throughout its activities. Yet, manufacturers had realised over time that this marks a largely technically driven terminology that insufficiently reflects upon convergence and key applications. Thus, in a wider approach to make the industry more attractive for younger generations while incorporating industrial realities, Eurovent members had requested a terminology that reflects the actual structure, development and ideals of the industry. This has led to the development of Eurovent into Europe's Industry Association for Indoor Climate, Process Cooling, and Food Cold Chain Technologies during the organisation's Annual Meeting in Stockholm in May 2015.

In 2015, the association's geographical scope was extended following an increasing number of requests from manufacturers in the Middle East and Northern Africa to support them in the development of high-quality standards and legislation. This went hand in hand with European manufacturers arguing that the terminology EMEA would already be commonly applied and that, in trade terms, Europe, the Middle East and Africa would increasingly grow together. In early 2018, Eurovent Middle East was set up as the association’s local chapter in the region.

Today, Eurovent is Europe's Industry Association for Indoor Climate, Process Cooling, and Food Cold Chain Technologies. Its members from throughout Europe represent more than 1.000 companies, the majority small and medium-sized. Based on objective and verifiable data, these account for a combined annual turnover of more than 30bn EUR, employing around 150.000 people within the association's geographic area. This makes Eurovent one of the largest cross-regional industry committees of its kind.

Structure
Eurovent's members from throughout Europe, the Middle East and Africa represent more than 1.000 companies, the majority small and medium-sized manufacturers. Based on objective and verifiable data, these account for a combined annual turnover of more than 30bn EUR, employing around 150.000 people within the association's geographic area. This makes Eurovent one of the largest cross-regional industry committees of its kind. The organisation's activities are based on highly valued democratic decision-making principles, ensuring a level-playing field for the entire industry independent from organisation sizes or membership fees.

Members

Eurovent Member Associations 
Eurovent's Member Associations are national sector associations from Europe that represent manufacturers in the area of Indoor Climate, Process Cooling, and Food Cold Chain technologies (‘HVACR’). Manufacturers that belong to a Eurovent Member Association are represented in Eurovent through their respective national association and are referred to as Affiliated Manufacturers.

Eurovent currently has 17 national Member Associations in its network:

Corresponding Members 
Corresponding Members are manufacturers from Europe which contribute a membership fee to Eurovent in order to participate directly in Eurovent activities.

Eurovent currently has 80 Corresponding Members:

Associate Members 
Associate Members are organisations that are engaged in activities related to sectors covered by the association. Associate Members include, for example, associations of engineers and consultants, exhibition organisers, laboratories, and universities.

Eurovent currently has seven Associate Members:

Decision-making bodies 
Key decisions are taken within one of Eurovent's two main bodies: The Board and the Eurovent Commission. The General Secretariat, with its headquarters in Brussels and regional offices in Milan and Prague, is the executive body taking care of the day-to-day association management.

Board of Directors 
The Eurovent Board of Directors is the main regulatory body in charge of the management of the association, comprising the elected President and up to fourteen elected Vice-Presidents, who are all high-ranking representatives from manufacturers of different sizes and countries. They are elected by the General Assembly with a majority of votes and appointed for a two-year term. The President is the main representative figure of the association. The President is responsible for the General Assembly and delegates parts of his powers to one or multiple Vice-Presidents within the Board. He is also the one chairing the Board, Eurovent Commission, and General Assembly meetings.

Commission 
Representatives of Eurovent's 17 Member Associations are gathered in the Eurovent Commission. The Eurovent Commission is in charge of defining the general political guidelines of the association, as well as monitoring and mediating the activities of its subordinated Product and Issue Groups.

General Assembly 
Once a year, the Eurovent General Assembly comes together to discuss the association's development, its future direction and policies. The General Assembly consists of one nominated representative from each Member Association.

General Secretariat 
The General Secretariat is headed by the Secretary General. This person is presented by the Board and appointed by the General Assembly. The Secretary General carries out specific tasks under the direction and supervision of the President. Eurovent's current Secretary General is Mr Felix Van Eyken.

Eurovent is registered under the European Union 'Transparency Register' - ID number: 89424237848-89 Transparency Register

Services
Eurovent provides several services.

Technical and regulatory affairs 
When drafting new legislation proposals on European level, the European Commission involves the Member States as well as European stakeholders. These three parties jointly shape the original draft proposals. The interaction between national associations and their Member States representatives supports this process. Once the European Commission has finalised its drafts, the Council and Parliament discuss the proposed legislation. Here, the contacts to the national ministries and nationally elected Members of the European Parliament (MEPs) help to fine-tune the law before adoption (or rejection). Together with its members acting at national level, Eurovent accompanies and guides these processes.

Next to areas that are covered by the European Union institutions, Eurovent members develop ‘codes of good practice’ and standards for areas not yet covered on European level. These 'codes of good practice' are published as 'Eurovent Recommendations'.

On technical issues regarding European legislation and the development of Eurovent Recommendations, Eurovent members work together within Product and Issue Groups.

Product and Issue Groups 
Manufacturers within the Eurovent network are grouped under Product and Issue Groups. Whereas Product Group activities cover technical issues related to one product type (e.g. air handling units), Issue Group activities cover horizontal issues (e.g. Indoor air quality). Within these groups, manufacturers:
 Actively participate in the development of European and international legislation, communicating and defending industry positions vis-à-vis political decision-makers and consultants
 Join forces to develop ‘codes of good practice’ for the industry (known as ‘Eurovent Recommendations’), which later find their ways into standards and legislation
 Share their expertise across borders, contributing to a level playing field towards markets with fewer barriers
 Meet up with their colleagues from around Europe to elaborate on developments within their markets

Industry representation 
One of Eurovent's key activities is representing the industry's achievements while bringing knowledge across to emerging markets around the globe in cooperation with local partners. Examples of these activities are:
 Joint participation to European sector exhibitions,
 Industry delegations to potential markets within Europe and beyond,
 European representation within global association ICARHMA.

ICARHMA 
Eurovent is a founding member of ICARHMA, the International Council of Air-Conditioning, Refrigeration, and Heating Manufacturers Associations, and represents European-oriented industry ideals in the latter. Once per year, representatives of ICARHMA's member associations from Australia, China, Japan, India, Korea, Latin and North America meet in a different host country to discuss ongoing policies and various other global issues related to the ‘HVACR’ industry including energy efficiency and environmental stewardship.

Events and exhibitions
In order to support its members in bringing technical knowledge across to emerging markets around the globe, as well as increase international trade opportunities, Eurovent has engaged cooperation with several European and extra-European sector exhibitions to provide benefits for its members. In addition, several industry delegations are organised every year to several of these exhibitions.

Delegations 
On a regular basis, Eurovent organises industry delegations in the course of sector exhibitions in emerging markets across the globe. These delegations bring together European decision-makers with their global counterparts. They are organised in cooperation with local partners, and usually accompanied by a dedicated side programme, including regional market seminars and meetings with authorities of the visited region. Example destinations include Dubai, Jakarta, Shanghai, and Moscow. The latter exhibition is also official partner of Eurovent.

Eurovent Summit 
The EUROVENTSUMMIT is a biennial event gathering key decision-makers in the area of Indoor Climate (HVAC), Process Cooling, and Food Cold Chain Technologies. Organised by the Eurovent Association, Eurovent Certita Certification, and Eurovent Market Intelligence, it connects over 500 manufacturers, industry associations, engineering societies, laboratories and political decision-makers from Europe, the Middle East, and Northern Africa throughout 40 meetings, seminars, and events. The 2014 EUROVENTSUMMIT took place in Berlin, Germany, the 2016 EUROVENTSUMMIT took place in Kraków, Poland, and the 2018 EUROVENTSUMMIT took place in Seville, Spain.[19]

Subunits
Eurovent has two subunits: Eurovent Certita Certification and Eurovent Market Intelligence. Both units are headquartered in Paris and operate independently from the association.

Eurovent Certita Certification 
Eurovent Certita Certification (ECC) is a provider of third-party performance certification programmes for the HVACR industry. The company is currently running over 40 certification programmes from its basis in Paris - both on national and global level. ECC's most well-known programme is the ‘Eurovent Certified Performance’ quality mark, which certifies the energy performance level of both domestic and industrial facilities.

Eurovent Market Intelligence 
Eurovent Market Intelligence (EMI) is the European Statistics Office for the HVACR market. Founded in 1994, EMI aims to establish a detailed map of the European, Middle-East and African market thanks to the manufacturers' participation in the data collections. Next to providing market data to HVACR manufacturers, EMI assists European legislative institutions such as the European Commission in shaping legislation according to key market data.
In 2019, EMI counted more than 300 participants in 15 programmes: Adiabatic coolers, Air Curtains, Air Filters, AHU, Chilled beams, Chillers, Cooling towers, Fan coils, Heat exchangers, IT Cooling, Pool dehumidifiers, Residential heat recovery, Rooftops, Split and VRF.

References

External links
 Eurovent Association
 Eurovent Certita Certification
 Eurovent Market Intelligence

Pan-European trade and professional organizations
Trade associations based in Belgium
Organizations established in 1958